Osfest was an annual music festival held at Oswestry Showground, organised by Seventh Sense Management.

History 
Plans for the festival were made public in December 2009. The first show took place in 2010 and featured headliner Lemar alongside a variety of local and national acts. In 2014, the festival was postponed until August, reportedly due to difficulty booking acts in May. Following the 2014 edition the organisers announced that the festival would not return for 2015 and for the foreseeable future.

Location
Osfest was held on the outskirts of the Shropshire market town Oswestry. The showground is host to a variety of farming markets throughout the year, including the Oswestry Show.

Yearly lineups
The 2012 headliner was Razorlight.

For 2014, the acts announced so far include: Wiley, Nina Nesbitt, Foxes (Singer), Neon Jungle, Conor Maynard, Union J, Elyar Fox and Luke Friend.

In 2013, the acts included: JLS  - LAWSON - WILEY - JAMES ARTHUR - THE ENEMY - THE PIGEON DETECTIVES - A*M*E - KING CHARLES - LUCY SPRAGGAN - GET CUBS - CHARLIE BROWN - TICH - PROPELLERS - ROOK AND THE RAVENS - JKLMNO - THE TASTE - DAN THE THIEF - DANNY GRUFF AND THE PEACEMAKERS - PORTLIGHTS - MAYDAYS - THE FALLOWS - SOUNDS & SCENARIOS Osfest Website LineUp Page

References

Music festivals in Shropshire